The Ansbachersandstein (German for Ansbach Sandstone) is a Late Triassic (Carnian) geologic formation in Germany. Indeterminate fossil ornithischian tracks have been reported from the formation.

Fossil content 
 Ichnofossils
  Garfield
 Apatopus lineatus
 Atreipus metzneri
 Chirotherium wondrai

See also 
 List of dinosaur-bearing rock formations
 List of stratigraphic units with ornithischian tracks
 Indeterminate ornithischian tracks
 Benkersandstein, contemporaneous ichnofossiliferous formation of Bavaria
 Chañares Formation, fossiliferous formation of the Ischigualasto-Villa Unión Basin, Argentina
 Candelária Formation, contemporaneous fossiliferous formation of the Paraná Basin, Brazil
 Molteno Formation, contemporaneous fossiliferous formation of Lesotho and South Africa
 Pebbly Arkose Formation, contemporaneous fossiliferous formation of Botswana, Zambia and Zimbabwe
 Denmark Hill Insect Bed, contemporaneous fossiliferous unit of Queensland, Australia
 Madygen Formation, contemporaneous Lagerstätte of Kyrgyzstan

References

Bibliography

Further reading 
 H. Klein and S. G. Lucas. 2013. The Late Triassic tetrapod ichnotaxon Apatopus lineatus (Bock 1952) and its distribution. In L. H. Tanner, J. A. Spielmann, S. G. Lucas (eds.), The Triassic System: New Mexico Museum of Natural History and Science (61)
 F. Heller. 1952. Reptilfährten-Funde aus dem Ansbacher Sandstein des Mittleren Keupers von Franken [Reptile track discoveries from the Anshbacher Sandstone of the Middle Keuper of Franconia]. Geologische Blätter für Nordost-Bayern und angrenzende Gebiete 2(4):129-141

Geologic formations of Germany
Triassic System of Europe
Carnian Stage
Triassic Germany
Sandstone formations
Ichnofossiliferous formations
Paleontology in Germany